Andrej Martin was the defending champion, but Radu Albot defeated and eliminated him already in the first round.
Denis Istomin won the title, defeating Malek Jaziri, who retired after Istomin won the first set by a score of 7–6(7–2).

Seeds

Draw

Finals

Top half

Bottom half

References
Main Draw
Qualifying Singles

2011 ATP Challenger Tour
2011 Singles